Lekhapani  is a railway station on the Lumding–Dibrugarh section. It is located in Tinsukia district in the Indian state of Assam.

History

Lekhapani railway station, opened around 1890, was a major coal-loading point for Tipong collieries. There is a display tablet at the station which says that the station was closed to commercial traffic in 1993 and the last train ran on the line in 1997. The railway station was restored in 2009.

Lekhapani used to be the easternmost railway station of Indian Railways. When gauge conversions took place around 1997, Ledo became the last and the easternmost station. The  broad gauge continued up to Tirap for railway sidings. Beyond that the remnants of the -wide metre-gauge track to Lekhapani was visible (as of 2005).

Stillwell Road
Lekhapani was the starting point of the Stillwell Road constructed by the Allied forces in 1942–45 through Burma to Kunming in China.

New line surveys 
Surveys are underway for -long line from Tirap to Lekhapani and -long line from Lekhapani to Kharsang in Arunachal Pradesh.

References 

Railway stations in Tinsukia district
Defunct railway stations in India
Tinsukia railway division